Pir Wadhai, is a town and a Union Council Of Rawalpindi Cityin Rawalpindi District, Pakistan. Pir Wadhai has a population of around 100,000, which includes a majority of Punjabis and Pathans, and a minority of Kashmiris and others. The town is a hub for many bus transportation companies that have stations located alongside the Pir Wadhai road.

Banks and post office
 MCB Bank Limited, (Muslim Commercial Bank)  Aziz Bhatti road (Old name: Clyde Road)
 National Bank.
 Post office, bus stop

References 

Union Councils of Rawalpindi City
Rawalpindi City
Populated places in Rawalpindi City